Paulo César Motta Donis (born 29 March 1982) is a Guatemalan football goalkeeper.

Club career
He represented club CSD Municipal in the tournament of Copa Interclubes UNCAF 2006. Finding it hard to become the number one goalkeeper behind Panamanian international Jaime Penedo he joined Deportivo Jalapa in 2009. After claims he would stay with Jalapa in June 2009, he eventually left them in September, apparently due to administrative problems.
He joined USAC for the 2009/2010 Clausura championship along with Selvin Motta and Honduran veteran striker Milton Núñez.

In June 2010 he joined newly promoted Mictlan., He left Mictlan in 2013.

In 2014, he returned to CDS Municipal, and being the number one goalkeeper, since joining them he played in three finals of Guatemala's Tournament, on the Apertura 2014 and Clausura 2015, which CSD Municipal lost to CDS Comunicaciones, and on the Apertura 2016, which the club lost to Antigua GFC on Penalties, despite Motta saving one penalty.

For much of the Clausura 2017, he was injured and was replaced by Goalkeeper Nicholas Hagen, he missed the rest of the tournament, which saw CSD Municipal being crowned champions for the first time since 2011 against Deportivo Guastatoya, he was released on a free transfer after the tournament.

For the Apertura 2017 he signed for recently promoted team "Deportivo Sanarate".

International career
Motta made his debut for Guatemala in an August 2003 friendly match against Ecuador and went on to collect a total of 13 caps, scoring no goals. He has represented his country at the UNCAF Nations Cup 2005, and the 2005 and 2007 CONCACAF Gold Cup Finals, although he did not come off the bench at the latter tournament.

He's first international match was a November 2007 friendly match against Honduras. He was part of Guatemala's National team that played in the Copa Oro 2015 in which he managed to kept a clean sheet against Mexico, however, Guatemala was knockout of the cup after a 1-0 to Cuba in the final match of the Copa Oro 2015.

On March 25, 2016, Motta made outstanding saves as Guatemala won against United States in a 2018 World Cup Qualification Match, their first victory over United States since 1983.

References

External links

1982 births
Living people
Guatemalan footballers
Guatemala international footballers
2003 CONCACAF Gold Cup players
2005 UNCAF Nations Cup players
2005 CONCACAF Gold Cup players
2007 UNCAF Nations Cup players
2007 CONCACAF Gold Cup players
2011 CONCACAF Gold Cup players
2013 Copa Centroamericana players
2014 Copa Centroamericana players
2015 CONCACAF Gold Cup players
C.S.D. Municipal players
Juventud Retalteca players
Deportivo Jalapa players
Deportivo Zacapa players
Deportivo Mictlán players
Deportivo Sanarate F.C. players
Cobán Imperial players
Liga Nacional de Fútbol de Guatemala players
Association football goalkeepers